Neocoenyra pinheyi is a butterfly in the family Nymphalidae. It is found in northern and south-central Tanzania. The habitat consists of open thorn-bush country at altitudes between 1,200 and 1,600 meters.

References

Satyrini
Butterflies described in 1961
Endemic fauna of Tanzania
Butterflies of Africa